, abbreviation of Hokkaido Artists' Network and Development, is a Japanese video game developer. The company originally started as a service selling Macintosh hardware and software to universities before the Mac platform was widely known. When competition in the field increased, h.a.n.d. reorganized to develop original software.

h.a.n.d.'s earliest known game is Treasure Strike, developed in collaboration with publisher, Kid, who released the PC follow-up to the Dreamcast original in 2004. The company consists of two other divisions—North Point Inc. for the development of mobile phone apps and other software, and S.N.S. Inc. who work on social games for Facebook and Mixi for external publishers.

List of games

References

External links 
Official English site

Video game companies established in 1993
Video game companies of Japan
Video game development companies
Companies based in Sapporo
Japanese companies established in 1993